The Hopwood Clock Tower, also known as Kerei Te Panau, but most commonly known simply as The Clock Tower, is a clock tower located in the centre of The Square in Palmerston North, New Zealand. The tower is named after local businessman Arthur Hopwood who paid for it to be constructed in 1953. The Maori name for the clock tower 'Kerei Te Panau' comes from the name of a local Rangitane chieftain.

The modern tower has two luminous features, a 'lantern cross' at its top and light-up glass panes at the base.

History

Originally housed in the city's post office on Main Street, the clock (which is named Kerei Te Panau after a local Rangitāne chieftain) was removed following the 1942 Wairarapa earthquake for safety reasons and placed into storage. In 1953 local business man Arthur Hopwood, whose family owned a hardware store, paid £10,000 for the council to build a new tower to house the clock. The tower was completed some time in 1957. A band rotunda was demolished to make way for the new tower.

The tower has been renovated many times since its construction. During the early 1960s, a stone cross was added atop the tower. The sound shell at the tower's base was removed  1990. During the refurbishment of The Square in the mid 2000s the building was checked against modern building regulations and was deemed that significant strengthening was needed. The tower was demolished and renewed with a stronger structure that matched the old design. The lantern section was added during this process also. This lantern features a cross inside, a symbol which divided the community as to whether it was appropriate. This process was completed in March 2007 and cost $1.7 million.

References

Buildings and structures in Palmerston North
Clock towers in New Zealand